Strmec is a small settlement to the east of Dole pri Litiji in the Municipality of Litija in central Slovenia. The area is part of the traditional region of Lower Carniola and is now included with the rest of the municipality in the Central Sava Statistical Region.

To the north of the settlement remains of an Early Iron Age hillfort and an associated tumulus burial ground have been identified.

References

External links
Strmec on Geopedia

Populated places in the Municipality of Litija